The  or Kōchi-ken (高知犬)  is a Japanese breed of dog from Shikoku island. It was designated by Japan as a culturally important national treasure in 1937.

Comparison to other Japanese breeds
The Shikoku is one of the six native Japanese breeds, it is intermediate in size between the large Akita Inu and the small Shiba Inu; all are within the Spitz family of dogs.

A study of the 1930s carried out by the Japanese cynologist Haruo Isogai classified all native Japanese dog breeds into three categories: large-, medium-, and small-sized. The Shikoku belongs to the Shika-inus, the medium-sized dogs. Other medium-sized dogs are the Kai Ken, the Ainu Ken and the Kishu Inu. They are all very similar with overlapping colors and only minor differences in size and morphology.

It also served as the partial ancestor to the Tosa after it was crossed with European breeds such as the Great Dane, Old English Bulldog, English Mastiff, St. Bernard (dog) and others.

Characteristics and temperament

Shikoku are typically brave but wary, and very alert to their environment. They should be sensitive without being nervous.

Shikoku dogs are tough and sufficiently athletic to run through mountainous terrain. The dog’s overall movement is agile and it should walk with springy steps.

They are an excellent companion for active outdoor people, though they can be very challenging to off-leash train. They are very energetic and active outside but they are generally calm and quiet indoors. The Shikoku is a very intelligent dog and a quick learner. They are not as stubborn and independent as some of the other native Japanese breeds, but still require patience to train.

The Shikoku stands 18.1–21.6 inches (46–55 cm) tall at the withers and comes in sesame (red with black tipping), black and tan, or red. Sesame coats are found in a range of saturation and black pigment- typically designated as red sesame, sesame, or black sesame. In addition, there is a cream colored coat that is rarely seen as it is not an accepted color in the breed. In all of these colors there is usually a mixture of white found around the underside of the body, near the eyes, snout, and legs called "urajiro".  The Shikoku tends to shed its coat at least one to two times a year. The dog has a fairly thick coat with pointed ears and a curved tail. The body conformation is typically of the spitz-type: the square body, the wedge-shaped head, the prick triangular ears, and thick curled tail.

The Shikoku dog is somewhat unusual in its appearance. It looks similar to a Siberian Husky dog physically, but differs in its size and color. The Shikoku Inu ranges  (male; approximately 20 inches tall; female; approximately 18.5 inches tall). This dog would be considered medium-sized.

Varieties
Out of the reconstruction effort, three distinct lines of the Shikoku were developed: the Awa, the Hongawa and the Hata all named after the area they originated from within the Kochi prefecture. More recently the distinction between these lines has been blurred as remote areas where the dogs originated became easier to access and lines were cross-bred. The modern Shikoku is thought to descend mainly from the Hongawa and Hata lines as the Awa line essentially disappeared as a result of the hardships caused by World War II and a lack of quality specimens due to cross breeding with outside dogs.

See also

 Dogs portal
 List of dog breeds

References

External links

 North American Shikoku Club (NASC)

FCI breeds
Spitz breeds
Dog breeds originating in Japan